"The Contendings of Horus and Seth" is a mythological story from the Twentieth Dynasty of Egypt found in the first sixteen pages of the Chester Beatty Papyri and deals with the battles between Horus and Seth to determine who will succeed Osiris as king.

Chester Beatty Papyrus I
The Papyrus Chester Beatty I dates to the Twentieth Dynasty during the reign of Ramesses V and likely came from a scribe's collection that was recorded for personal entertainment (Chester Beatty Pap I, Oxford). The papyrus contains the story of The Contendings of Horus and Seth as well as various other poetic love songs. The original provenance of the papyrus was Thebes. When found, the papyrus measured  and had been torn and crushed. The papyrus was published by the Oxford University Press in 1931 and currently is located in the Chester Beatty Library in Dublin.

The story
Arguably the most important part of the Chester Beatty Papyrus I is the mythological story of "The Contendings of Horus and Seth" which deals with the battles between Horus and Seth to see who will be the successor to the throne of Osiris. The specific time of the Contendings is a period during which the fighting has temporarily stopped and Seth and Horus have brought their case before the Ennead. Throughout the story, Horus and Seth have various competitions to see who will be king. Horus beats Seth each time. The beginning of the story is a sort of a trial when both Seth and Horus plead their cases and the deities of the Ennead state their opinions. Later in the story, Set fights with Horus and after several long battles Horus finally wins and becomes the king.

Consequences of the story
The story of "The Contendings of Horus and Seth" is important to Egyptian society because of its significance to kingship. The story reflects the customary pattern of inheritance for kingship in Ancient Egypt: father to son. The story is also significant to the idea of divine kingship because it sets up the idea of the triad of Osiris as the dead king, Horus as the living king on earth, and Isis as the king's mother.

Further reading and academic analyses
Many researchers and Egyptologists have dealt with "The Contendings of Horus and Seth". John Gwyn Griffiths, for example, talks about the whole conflict between Horus and Seth in his book The Conflict of Horus and Set. In the book, Griffiths discusses the different aspects of the ongoing battle for the office of Osiris, including the mutilations, homosexual episode, and the trial. Griffiths argues that the myth is of political and historical origin and that the story of Horus and Seth has to do with tribal struggles before the unification of Egypt. Other historians have discarded this idea when it comes to "The Contendings of Horus and Seth" and say that this particular story was created simply as a religious myth and that it should not be considered of historical context (Oxford Encyclopedia of Ancient Egypt).

In Ancient Egyptian Literature, Antonio Loprieno argues that the Contendings is one of the first instances of "mythology as a textual genre" and when mythology enters the literary field. He says that this has to do with the story as a political satire (Loprieno 50)

In the Oxford publication of the Chester Beatty Papyrus I that contains "The Contendings of Horus and Seth", the discussion is conducted by Alan H. Gardiner, where he compares the story with the stories of the Greek deities and of Homer's Odyssey.

See also
Ancient Egyptian literature

References

Donald B. Redford, "Contendings of Horus and Seth" The Oxford Encyclopedia of Ancient Egypt. Ed. Donald B. Redford. Copyright © 2001, 2005 by Oxford University Press, Inc.. The Oxford Encyclopedia of Ancient Egypt: (e-reference edition). Oxford University Press. Loyola University of Chicago. 28 October 2010
Simpson, William Kelly, and Robert Kriech Ritner. The Literature of Ancient Egypt: an Anthology of Stories, Instructions, Stelae, Autobiographies, and Poetry. New Haven, CT: Yale UP, 2003. Print.

Ancient Egyptian texts
Ancient Egyptian society
Manuscripts in the Chester Beatty Library
Horus
Set (deity)